Gordon Spiring (25 August 1918 – 1997) was an English professional footballer who played in the Football League for Bristol City as an outside left.

Personal life 
Spiring served in the British Armed Forces during the Second World War.

References 

English footballers
English Football League players
Bristol City F.C. players
Date of death missing
England amateur international footballers
British military personnel of World War II
1918 births
1997 deaths
Footballers from Bristol
Association football outside forwards